Hitchcockian films are those made by various filmmakers, with the styles and themes similar to those of Alfred Hitchcock.

Characteristics
Elements considered Hitchcockian include:

Climactic plot twist.
The cool platinum blonde.
The presence of a domineering mother in someone's life.
An innocent man accused.
Restricting the action to a single setting to increase tension (e.g. Lifeboat, Rear Window).
Characters who switch sides and/or who cannot be trusted.
Tension building through suspense to the point where the audience enjoys seeing the character in a life-threatening situation (e.g. Vertigo).
Average people thrust into strange or dangerous situations (e.g., Psycho, North by Northwest, The Man Who Knew Too Much).
Bumbling or incompetent authority figures, particularly police officers.
Use of darkness to symbolize impending doom (dark clothing, shadows, smoke, etc.)
Strong visual use of famous landmarks (Statue of Liberty, Mount Rushmore, Forth Rail Bridge, Golden Gate Bridge, Albert Hall, British Museum, Piccadilly Circus, etc.)
Mistaken identity (e.g. North by Northwest, Frenzy).
The use of a staircase as a motif for impending danger or suspense.
Use of a MacGuffin plot device.
Referring to crime for mystery rather than presenting it explicitly (e.g. Dial M for Murder).
Train scenes.

Notable examples
Some films, or films with scenes, considered Hitchcockian include:

Gaslight (1944)
Niagara (1953)
23 Paces to Baker Street (1956)
Witness for the Prosecution (1957)
Midnight Lace (1960)
Cape Fear (1962)
Charade (1963)
From Russia with Love (1963)
The Prize (1963)
Arabesque (1966)
Blowup (1966)
Wait Until Dark (1967)
Duel (1971)
Play Misty for Me (1971)
The Last of Sheila (1973)
Jaws (1975)
Obsession (1976)
Last Embrace (1979)
Blue Velvet (1986)
Fatal Attraction (1987)
Arachnophobia (1990)
Misery (1990)
Cape Fear (1991)
Basic Instinct (1992)
12 Monkeys (1995)
Bound (1996)
Double Jeopardy (1999)
What Lies Beneath (2000)
Mulholland Drive (2001)
Panic Room (2002)
Phone Booth (2002)
Disturbia (2007)
Side Effects (2013)
Stoker (2013)
Not Safe for Work (2014)
Crimson Peak (2015)
The Gift (2015)
Don't Breathe (2016)
Nocturnal Animals (2016)
A Kind of Murder (2016)
Split (2016)
Gerald's Game (2017)
A Simple Favor (2018)

Filmmakers
The following is a list of filmmakers who have directed multiple Hitchcockian films:
Dario Argento
Park Chan-wook
Henri-Georges Clouzot
Brian De Palma

Films by country

Australia
Roadgames (1981)
Crosstalk (1982)
Coffin Rock (2009)
Blame (2010)
Crawl (2011)
Bad Blood (2017)

France
Les Diaboliques (1955)
Le Boucher (1970)
The Vanishing (1988)
Love Crime (2010)
Elle (2016)
Personal Shopper (2016)

Germany
Unknown (2011)

Spain
Buried (2010)

United Kingdom
Peeping Tom (1960)

See also
Alfred Hitchcock
Alfred Hitchcock filmography
Giallo
Krimi
Thriller film

References

Bibliography

External links
 Entertainment Weekly's EW.com feature: What, exactly, makes a film "Hitchcockian?"

Alfred Hitchcock
Film and video terminology